Rajender is a given name and a surname. Notable people with the name include:

Rajender Kumar (born 1985), Indian wrestler
Rajender Rawat (born 1975), Indian cricketer
Akula Rajender (born 1959), Indian politician belonging to Indian National Congress
Etela Rajender (born 1964), the first finance minister of Telangana State

See also
Patnam Rajender Reddy Memorial Engineering College (PRRM), engineering college in Shabad Mandal, Rangareddy district, Telangana, India
Rajender v. University of Minnesota, landmark class action lawsuit dealing with sexual discrimination at an American university
Rajinder
Rajendra (name)
Rajendar